Capital punishment was abolished in Ukraine in 2000. In 1995 Ukraine entered the Council of Europe and thus it was obliged to abolish the death penalty. The Verkhovna Rada introduced amendments to the then-acting Criminal Code in 2000, according to which “death penalty” was withdrawn from the list of official punishments of Ukraine. Ukraine carried out its last execution in 1997 according to Amnesty International.

History
Capital punishment in Ukraine existed soon after the fall of the Russian Empire in 1917. Among the list of known people who were executed by the Ukrainian authorities was Ivan Samosenko.

In 1995, Ukraine entered the Council of Europe and one of the obligations it had to undertake with this act was to abolish the death penalty. The Verkhovna Rada undertook little actions to do so until September 1998 after international pressure from the Council of Europe and the European Union.  At the request of the People's Deputies of Ukraine, the Constitutional Court ruled the death penalty unconstitutional in December 1999. The Verkhovna Rada introduced amendments to the then-acting Criminal Code in April 2000 that withdrew capital punishment from the list of official punishments in Ukraine (in peace and wartime).

Ukraine was the last Council of Europe member state that used to be part of the Eastern Bloc to abolish the death penalty for peacetime offenses. Latvia, also a former Soviet republic, abolished it for wartime offenses only in 2012.

Politics
National Corps, a Ukrainian far-right political party, supports bringing back the death penalty.

Reintroduction in Donetsk and Luhansk People's Republics
The Donetsk People's Republic, a Russian occupied, partially recognized breakaway state in territory internationally recognized as part of Ukraine, introduced the death penalty in 2014 for cases of treason, espionage, and assassination of political leaders. There had already been accusations of extrajudicial executions occurring. The Luhansk People's Republic, which is also a partially recognized secessionist breakaway state in what is widely recognized as Ukrainian territory, has also reintroduced capital punishment.

On June 9, 2022, following the siege of Mariupol during the Russian Invasion of Ukraine, British volunteers to Ukraine Aiden Aslin and Shaun Pinner, and Moroccan Brahim Saadoun were sentenced to death for "terroristic activities" in a proceeding widely described as a show trial; however, they were later released in a POW exchange between Ukraine and Russian authorities.

The Ukrainian government, which does not recognize the independence of these republics, has threatened to prosecute anyone involved in such executions for murder.

References

External links

 
Human rights abuses in Ukraine
Law of Ukraine
Death in Ukraine
2000 disestablishments
1997 disestablishments
1995 disestablishments